The Niaosung Culture was an archaeological culture in southern Taiwan. It distributed around the region of Tainan and Kaohsiung. The culture existed in the Iron Age of Taiwan island. Some evidences suggested that Niaosung Culture was directly relative to the Siraya people, an aboriginal tribe which is still living in this area. 

There is a set of several archaeological sites formed the culture, such as the Niaosung Site (蔦松遺址), Futingchin Site (覆頂金遺址), Hsiliao Site (西寮遺址) and Kanhsi Site (看西遺址). Some were discovered in the archaeological research excavations, and some in other works such as digging fish farms or building factories. These sites had been excavated out potteries or middens.

See also
Tahu Culture
List of archaeological sites in Taiwan
Prehistory of Taiwan

References

Archaeological cultures in Taiwan
Iron Age cultures of Asia
Tainan
Kaohsiung
Archaeological cultures of East Asia